Pentila camerunica, the Cameroon cream pentila, is a butterfly in the family Lycaenidae. It is found in southern Nigeria and southern Cameroon. The habitat consists of forests.

References

Butterflies described in 1961
Poritiinae